The Cockerill i-X (interceptor and X for “modular-multi-weapons system) is an armoured vehicle manufactured by the Belgian company Cockerill. The vehicle is 4x4 and has stealth capability.

The Cockerill i-X is a land stealth ground vehicle that can use various weapon platforms ranging from 25/30mm autocannons to missiles etc. The vehicle has a modified IR signature. It is also rigged up with onboard AI, smart helmet issued to driver/crew to operate in conjunction with cameras/night vision/thermal imagers, LWS and various detection/recon/tracking devices.

The i-X was publicly unveiled at the inaugural World Defense Show in Riyadh, Saudi Arabia in March 2022.

On 21 February 2023 at the International Defence Exhibition in Abu Dhabi, Cockerill and Nimr announced a teaming agreement to collaborate on bringing the i-X to market.

See also
 List of armoured fighting vehicles by country

References

Cockerill i-X official website

Military vehicles of Belgium
Off-road vehicles
All-wheel-drive vehicles
Armoured cars
Armoured fighting vehicles of the post–Cold War period